The presidential bulava (mace) is one of the official symbols of the President of Ukraine.

The mace of the President of Ukraine testifies to the continuity of centuries-old historical traditions of Ukrainian statehood - ceremonial maces were signs of power of Ukrainian hetmans, Kosh atamans of the Zaporozhian Sich and registered Cossack colonels.

Description 
The presidential bulava is made of gold-plated gilded silver and fitted with a total of 64 emeralds and garnets, mounted in gold. It contains a three-edged damask blade bearing a Latin phrase “Omnia revertitur”, meaning Everything returns. The blade can be extracted from the mace by means of a button decorated with a Yakut emerald. Together, the bulava weighs 750 grams.

The bulava consists of two hollowed parts: the handle and the top, called the "apple". The "apple" is decorated with gold ornamental medallions and crowned with a gold stylised wreath decorated with enamelled stones. The top of the mace is adorned with golden ornamental medallions and crowned with an enameled and gemmed golden wreath.

The bulava is kept in a mahogany case, decorated with a golden relief image of the Ukrainian coat of arms. The lodgement is made of purple velvet. First, a lock was placed on the case, which was later replaced by a gilded figure of a guardian angel, so as not to complicate the opening of the casket during ceremonies.

See also 
 Bulawa

External links 
 Указ Президента України від 29.11.1999 № 1507/99 «Про офіційні символи глави держави»
 Офіційні Символи президента України
 Державні символи Президента України

National symbols of Ukraine
Ceremonial maces